Events in the year 2014 in Bosnia and Herzegovina.

Incumbents
President: Bakir Izetbegović, Nebojša Radmanović, and Željko Komšić (until November 17) Bakir Izetbegović, Mladen Ivanić, and Dragan Čović (from November 17)
Prime Minister: Vjekoslav Bevanda

Events
4 February – 2014 unrest in Bosnia and Herzegovina began.
7 February – After days of rioting in Bosnia, the presidency building in Sarajevo is attacked.

13 May – 2014 Southeast Europe floods hit the country.
16 May – Tens of thousands of people are being evacuated in Serbia and Bosnia as heavy rains cause floods.

28 June – Sarajevo commemorates the 100th anniversary of the assassination of Archduke Franz Ferdinand of Austria that led to World War I.

12 October – 2014 Bosnian general election took place.

Deaths

September
25 September – Sulejman Tihić, politician, member and chairman of the Presidency (b. 1951).

References

External links

 
Years of the 21st century in Bosnia and Herzegovina
2010s in Bosnia and Herzegovina
Bosnia and Herzegovina
Bosnia and Herzegovina